Loredana Cannata (born 14 July 1975) is an Italian movie, television and theater actress.

Biography 

Born in Ragusa, Italy, Cannata studied acting while growing up in her native Sicily. She started early on to play leading roles in several stage plays, some of which based on works by Luigi Pirandello (Liolà), Euripides (The Trojan Women) and Arthur Schnitzler (La Ronde). In 1999 she made her film debut in The Man-Eater directed by Aurelio Grimaldi.

Cannata has also appeared in numerous television series throughout her career. Since 2001 she has been starring, alongside Italian actor Sebastiano Somma, in Un caso di coscienza, a long running TV series broadcast on Rai Uno, one of Italy's state owned channels. Un caso di coscienza is now in its fifth season. She was cast in the 2005-2006 Italian edition of Strictly Come Dancing. She came back to the movies in 2012 with "Magnifica presenza", directed by Ferzan Ozpetek and "The Early Years" directed by Paolo Sorrentino in 2015.

Additionally, Cannata is president of "Sesto Sole" (6th Sun), an Italian charity organization that provides health related help to the indigenous population of the Chiapas. She is vegan and supports animals rights. In 2003 she directed the documentary Insurgentes about the Mexican Revolution, and in 2006, she directed another documentary about the Zapatists.

Career

Theater 
 Liolà, Luigi Pirandello (1993–94)
 The Trojan Women, Euripides (1996)
 All' uscita, L. Pirandello (1996)
 La Ronde, Arthur Schnitzler, director A. Marziantonio (1997)
 Orgasmica Soirée, regia di F. Soldi (1999)
 Benzina, director Daniele Falleri (2001)
 Per il resto tutto bene, director Claudio Boccaccini (2010-2011)
 Una donna di Ragusa - Maria Occhipinti, director Loredana Cannata (2011-2012-2015)
 (Odio) gli indifferenti 02/06/05, written and directed by herself (2012)
 "Marilyn - Her words", written and directed by herself (2014-2015)

Film 
 La donna lupo (The man-eater), directed by Aurelio Grimaldi (1999)
 Sotto gli occhi di tutti, directed by Nello Correale (1999)
 Maestrale, directed by Sandro Cecca (2000)
 Ustica. Una spina nel cuore, directed by Romano Scavolini (2001)
 Gabriel, directed by Maurizio Angeloni (2001)
 Sotto gli occhi di tutti, directed by Nello Correale (2002)
 Senso '45, directed by Tinto Brass (2002)
 Un mondo d'amore, directed by Aurelio Grimaldi (2002)
 Albakiara, directed by Stefano Salvati (2008)
 Magnificent Presence, directed by Ferzan Ozpetek (2012)
 Youth, directed by Paolo Sorrentino (2015)
 Scarlett, directed by Luigi Boccia (2018)
 The Goddess of Fortune, directed by Ferzan Ozpetek (2019)

Television 
 La voce del sangue, regia di Alessandro Di Robilant - Film TV (1999)
 Giochi pericolosi, regia di Alfredo Angeli - Film TV (2000)
 La casa delle beffe, regia di Pier Francesco Pingitore - Miniserie TV (2000)
 Villa Ada, regia di Pier Francesco Pingitore - Film TV (2000)
 Il bello delle donne 2, regia di Gianni Dalla Porta, Luigi Parisi, Maurizio Ponzi e Giovanni Soldati - Serie TV (2002)
 La squadra 3, Serie TV (2002)
 Un caso di coscienza, regia di Luigi Perelli - Miniserie TV (2003)
 Il bello delle donne 3, regia di Maurizio Ponzi e Luigi Parisi - Serie TV (2003)
 Madame, regia di Salvatore Samperi - Film TV (2004)
 La caccia, regia di Massimo Spano - Miniserie TV  (2005)
 Un caso di coscienza 2, regia di Luigi Perelli - Miniserie TV (2005)
 Finalmente Natale, regia di Rossella Izzo - Film TV (2007)
 Exodus - Il sogno di Ada, regia di Gianluigi Calderone - Miniserie TV (2007)
 Finalmente a casa, regia di Gianfranco Lazotti - Film TV (2008)
 Provaci ancora prof, regia di Rossella Izzo - Miniserie TV (2008)
 Un caso di coscienza 3, regia di Luigi Perelli - Miniserie TV (2008)
 Un caso di coscienza 4, regia di Luigi Perelli - Miniserie TV (2009)
 Viso d'angelo, regia di Eros Puglielli - Miniserie TV (2011)
 Un caso di coscienza 5, regia di Luigi Perelli - Miniserie TV (2013)
 Una pallottola nel cuore, regia di Luca Manfredi - TV series (2014)
 Romanzo siciliano, regia di Lucio Pellegrini - TV series (2015)
 Questo è il mio paese, regia di Michele Soavi - TV series (2015)

Documentary 

 Insurgentes, director Loredana Cannata (2003)
 Monógamo sucesivo, director Pablo Basulto (2004)
 L'alba del Sesto Sole, director Roberto Salinas (2008)
 Calvino Cosmorama, director Damian Pettigrew (2010) coproduzione Italia-Francia-Canada

Spot 
 Against the pizzo - PSA
 For energy conservation - National Geographic Channel Italy
 Yellow Pages director Gabriele Muccino

References

External links 

 
 Loredana Cannata on MyMovies
 
 

1975 births
Living people
People from Ragusa, Sicily
Italian film actresses
Italian stage actresses
Actors from the Province of Ragusa